Loxopholis ioanna is a species of lizard in the family Gymnophthalmidae. It is endemic to Colombia.

References

Loxopholis
Reptiles of Colombia
Endemic fauna of Colombia
Reptiles described in 1971
Taxa named by Thomas Marshall Uzzell, Jr.
Taxa named by John C. Barry